Timofeyev (masculine) or Timofeyeva (feminine) is a common Russian surname that is derived from the male given name Timofey and literally means Timofey's. It is shared by the following people:

Alexey Timofeev (born 1991), Russian curler from Saint Petersburg
Anatoly Timofeyev (1887–1985), Russian fencer
Andrei Timofeyev (born 1996), Russian football player
Anna Timofeeva (born 1987), Russian water polo player
Anna Timofeyeva (ice hockey) (born 1996), Russian ice hockey player
Artyom Timofeev (chess player) (born 1985), Russian chess player
Artyom Timofeyev (footballer) (born 1994), Russian association football player
Avdotia Timofeyeva (1739–?), Russian ballet dancer
Ermak Timofeev (1532–1585), Cossack ataman, hero in Russian folklore and myths
Evgeniy Timofeev (born 1994), alpine skier from Kyrgyzstan
Irina Timofeyeva (born 1970), Russian long-distance runner
Kristina Timofeeva (born 1993), Russian archer
Lev Timofeev (born 1936), Russian economist, political commentator and novelist
Lidija Timofejeva (1906–1991), Serbian chess player of Russian origin
Maria Timofeeva (born 2003), Russian tennis player
Marina Timofeieva (born 1984), Estonian ice dancer
Nikolay Timofeev-Ressovsky (1900–1981), Soviet biologist
Nina Timofeeva (1935–2014), Russian ballet dancer
Oleg Timofeyev (born 1963), American musicologist and musician
Olga Timofeeva (born 1977), deputy for the United Russia party, former journalist
Sergei Timofeyev (footballer, born 1981), Russian former football player
Sergei Vasilyevich Timofeyev (1970–1997), Russian professional association footballer
Sergey Timofeev (born 1965), Kazakh association football player
Sergey Timofeyev (1950–2021), Soviet wrestler
Valentina Timofeyeva, Russian rower
Valeri Timofeev (1941–2014), Latvian artist
Vitali Timofeyev (born 1982), Russian association football player
Yulia Timofeeva (born 1972), Russian bobsledder
Yekaterina Mulyuk-Timofeyeva (born 1976), Belarusian archer
Yevgeniya Timofeeva (1911–1992), pilot in the Soviet Air Force, the first woman to fly the Pe-2
Yulia Timofeeva (born 1972), Russian former track and field sprinter and bobsledder

Russian-language surnames
Patronymic surnames
Surnames from given names